The El Salvador national badminton team represents El Salvador in international badminton team competitions. The El Salvador junior team have competed in the BWF World Junior Championships mixed team event, which is also called the Suhandinata Cup.

El Salvador won their first badminton medal at the 2022 Pan Am Badminton Championships.

Participation in BWF competitions 
Suhandinata Cup

Participation in Pan American Badminton Championships 
Mixed team

Current squad 

Male players
Uriel Canjura
Carlos Henrriquez

Female players
Katherine Guzman
Camila Navas

References 

Badminton
National badminton teams